Ronald Clarence Kulpa (born October 5, 1968) is an American umpire in Major League Baseball. He wears uniform number 46.

Umpiring career
Kulpa's professional umpiring career began in 1992 and he advanced to the Pacific Coast League in 1998. Kulpa was one of the 22 umpires promoted in the wake of the Major League Umpires Association's mass-resignation strategy in July , and was named to the National League staff for the remainder of the 1999 season. When the umpiring staffs from the two leagues merged for the  season, Kulpa began working in both leagues.

He has worked several MLB Special Events, including the All-Star Game (2001, 2015), Wild Card (2020), Division Series (2001, 2002, 2006, 2007, 2008, 2009, 2011, 2017, 2020, 2021), League Championship Series (2005, 2013, 2014), and World Series (2011, 2021). He also officiated in the 2009 World Baseball Classic. Kulpa was named a Crew Chief for the 2022 MLB season.

Controversies
Kulpa was head-butted by Carl Everett of the Boston Red Sox in 2000 during an argument about the location of the inner boundary of the batter's box.  Everett was suspended for 10 games and fined.

Working first base in Game 3 of the 2011 World Series (his first World Series as an umpire), Kulpa controversially called St. Louis Cardinals hitter Matt Holliday safe after Holliday grounded into what would have been the second out of a routine double play in the game's fourth inning. Kulpa claimed that Holliday had arrived at first base prior to the tag from Texas Rangers first baseman Mike Napoli, although replays subsequently proved that Napoli had indeed tagged him out by a full stride, prior to Holliday's stumbling across the base and falling. Kulpa later told a pool reporter after the game that he was aware Napoli had tagged Holliday, but he thought Holliday's foot was already on the base. He did not ask for a second opinion. When the game ended, Kulpa reviewed the play on tape and admitted he should have called Holliday out. The Cardinals went on to win the game 16–7, and eventually won the Series in seven games.

On August 12, 2013, he ejected Rangers catcher A. J. Pierzynski for arguing a ball three call during pitcher Yu Darvish's bid for a perfect game against the Houston Astros. The perfect game was broken up moments later on an ensuing ball four pitch to Astros batter Jonathan Villar.

During the 2nd inning of an Astros-Rangers game on April 4, 2019, after a low pitch from Mike Minor outside the strikezone to Tyler White was called a strike, the Astros dugout expressed displeasure at the call, to which Kulpa responded back. After a short conversation with Astros manager A.J Hinch, Kulpa proceeded to stare into the Astros dugout while Minor was on the mound ready to pitch. After Hinch told Kulpa to "Look over there", Kulpa proceeded to eject Astros hitting coach Alex Cintron. On the following pitch, after no further provocation by the Astros dugout, Kulpa again stared at the Astros dugout, leading to Hinch telling Kulpa "You can't keep doing it". Kulpa responded with "I can do anything I want", before ejecting Hinch from the game. Kulpa would later interrupt Astro's pitcher Gerrit Cole's warm-up pitches before the 4th inning after having instigated an argument with Cole and Astro's catcher Max Stassi, after Cole began walking to the dugout after a potential 3rd strike that was instead called a ball by Kulpa.

On April 8, 2021, Kulpa made a controversial call as the home-plate umpire of a game between the New York Mets and the Marlins. The game was tied at 2-2 in the bottom of the ninth inning, and the bases were loaded for the Mets. Michael Conforto of the Mets went up to the plate. The controversy ensued after a pitch thrown by closer Anthony Bass hit Conforto. Kulpa, however, ruled it to be a hit by pitch, even though the pitch was a strike, and Conforto seemed to lean into the pitch. The Mets walked off and won the game. Kulpa later talked to reporters and admitted that he made the wrong call. Both managers of the teams commented on the call. Don Mattingly, manager of the Marlins, remarked: "Kulpa knows it was a strike. He couldn't go backwards in his mind. Honestly, he's probably feeling bad. To be honest with you, I bet he feels awful." However, Luis Rojas, manager of the Mets, commented that Conforto did not intentionally lean in, claiming: "I looked at the replay ... I don't think he leans, but that's kind of how he moves his hands. Even throwing to him in batting practice, he does that on pitches in."

Notable games
Kulpa was the home plate umpire when Detroit Tigers pitcher Justin Verlander threw a no-hitter at Comerica Park vs. the Milwaukee Brewers on June 12, . Five days before Verlander's no-hitter, Kulpa called balls and strikes in a game between the Red Sox and the Oakland Athletics in which Boston pitcher Curt Schilling had a no-hitter until Shannon Stewart broke up the no-hitter with a single with two outs in the bottom of the ninth inning.

Kulpa was the first base umpire on July 9, 2011, when Derek Jeter of the New York Yankees got his 3000th career hit against the Tampa Bay Rays. He was the plate umpire for Henderson Álvarez's no-hitter on September 29, 2013.

On September 13, 2020, Kulpa was the first base umpire for a no-hitter thrown by Alec Mills of the Chicago Cubs against the Milwaukee Brewers.

Personal life
Prior to pursuing professional umpiring, Kulpa attended Florissant Valley Community College before transferring to Missouri Baptist College, where he was a member of the baseball team, but rarely played.

See also

 List of Major League Baseball umpires

References

External links

 Major league profile
 Retrosheet
 Umpire Ejection Fantasy League Profile

1968 births
Living people
Major League Baseball controversies
Major League Baseball umpires
Missouri Baptist Spartans baseball players
Sportspeople from St. Louis